The 2019 Australian World Swimming Trials are current being held from 9 to 14 June 2019 at the Brisbane Aquatic Centre in Brisbane, Queensland. The event is the selection trails for the 2019 World Aquatics Championships in Gwangju, South Korea.

Following Australia's performance at the 2016 Rio Olympics where 29 medals were won and finishing 10th on the medal tally, Swimming Australia announced in the February 2017 that the timing of the selection trails would be modified. Historically, the trails were held in April several months before the Olympics were held. This will be now changed to follow the American model where the trails are held six weeks before. 

A Para Grand Prix will be held in conjunction with the trials on the 13 to 14 June 2019.

The legends relay was a mixed 4 × 50 m freestyle event swam on the fourth night of the meet. The team were:
 Team Frame - Trevor Green, Marcelo Figueredo, Aaron Boersma and Linley Frame
 Team Fraser - David Barrett, Brendan Dyer, Therese Crollick, Sandra Wylie
 Team Rickard - Jane Sadler, Michael Lee, Jennifer Campbell, Brenton Rickard
 Team Gallen - Jason Burgess, Jodie Greensill, Gillian O'Mara, Michelle Gallen
 Team Flouch - Jamie Coates, Casey Flouch, Todd Robinson, Kylie Fletcher
 Team Schipper - Martin Banks, Janette Jeffrey, Gerry Tucker, Jessicah Schipper
 Team FFrost - Nick Ffrost, Maree Antonio and Russell Booysen

The event was won by Team Flouch in a time of 1:57.99, followed by Team Gallen (2:02.86) and Team FFrost where Nick Ffrost swam the backstroke and freestyle legs (2:17.02).

Schedule  

M = Morning session, E = Evening session

Medal winners
The results are below.

Men's events

Men's multiclass events

Women's events

Women's multiclass events

Legend:

Records broken
During the 2019 Australian World Swimming Trails the following records were set.

Commonwealth, Oceanian and Australian records
 Men's 200 m individual medley – Mitch Larkin, St Peters Western (1:55.72) (final)
 Women's 400 m freestyle – Ariarne Titmus, St Peters Western (3:59.35) (final)

Notes

References

World Swimming Trails
Australian World Swimming Trails
Sports competitions in Brisbane
2010s in Brisbane
Australian World Swimming Trails
Olympics trials